Luo Yigang (born 22 March 1975) is a retired Chinese badminton player and currently serving as national badminton coach of Chinese team.

Career 
Luo Yigang is a former star in China's men's singles. He has a high savvy, comprehensive technique and steady style of play. He can often give full play to his level in the game. After starting badminton at the age of 9, Yigang entered the Hunan team when he turned 13. Luo made China's B team at the beginning of 1996, and the A team a few months later. In 96, he won the silver medal in the Asian Championships, losing the final to Indonesia's Jeffer Rosobin. He qualified for 1997 World Badminton Grand Prix Finals. 1998 was his best year as he won the Swedish Open and was a semi-finalist at the All England. Besides this he won another medal at the Asian Championships and again qualified for year-end Grand Prix Finals. In 1999, he won the Malaysian Open and finished as semifinalist spot in Korean Open. In 2001, he won National Championships by beating Lin Dan in the final. His last match was played in Paris, where he won the 2002 French Open, then an International Challenge tournament where afterwards he retired from National team. His best achievement in a team event was a silver medal in the 1998 Asian Games in Bangkok and a silver at 2000 Thomas Cup.

After leaving the national team, Luo Yigang spent more than half a year in the Hunan provincial team. In 2003, after obtaining the permission of the Hunan provincial team and the national team, he chose to go to Denmark to develop and teach in a badminton club in Copenhagen. He also represented Club competition there. In 2005, he returned to Hunan provincial team to start coaching the players. By 2007, he was selected as a coach in National Youth training team. In 2018, he replaced Zhang Ning as National Women's singles team coach after a poor showing in Uber Cup. He is currently coaching Chinese Women's singles players.

Achievements

Asian Championships 
Men's singles

Asian Cup 
Men's singles

IBF World Grand Prix 
The World Badminton Grand Prix sanctioned by International Badminton Federation (IBF) from 1983 to 2006.

Men's singles

IBF International 
Men's singles

References 

1975 births
Living people
Sportspeople from Hunan
Badminton players from Hunan
Chinese male badminton players
Badminton players at the 1998 Asian Games
Asian Games silver medalists for China
Asian Games medalists in badminton
Medalists at the 1998 Asian Games
Chinese badminton coaches
20th-century Chinese people